Rui Filipe da Costa Cardoso (born 11 May 1994) is a Portuguese footballer who plays for AD Castro Daire as a forward.

Football career
On 6 November 2013, Cardoso made his professional debut with Leixões in a 2013–14 Segunda Liga match against Santa Clara, when he replaced Mailó (79th minute).

References

External links

Stats and profile at LPFP 

1994 births
People from Cinfães
Living people
Portuguese footballers
Association football forwards
Liga Portugal 2 players
Leixões S.C. players
C.D. Cinfães players
A.D. Sanjoanense players
Sportspeople from Viseu District